The Xiju Power Plant is a diesel-fuel power plant in Xiju Island, Juguang Township, Lienchiang County, Taiwan.

History
The power plant was commissioned in 1979. Due to the changes in electricity needs, Xiju Power Plant was connected by submarine power cable to Dongju Power Plant in Dongju Island since 2000.

See also

 List of power stations in Taiwan
 Electricity sector in Taiwan

References

1979 establishments in Taiwan
Buildings and structures in Lienchiang County
Energy infrastructure completed in 1979
Juguang Township
Oil-fired power stations in Taiwan